The Martial Arts Kid is a 2015 martial arts film directed by Michael Baumgarten and starring Don "The Dragon" Wilson and Cynthia Rothrock as a couple who take in their nephew Jansen Panettiere, and teach him martial arts when he is bullied. Most of the supporting cast of the film are actual martial artists, some of whom appear as themselves in the film.

Plot
Robbie Oakes is a Cleveland high schooler who after losing his mother, finds himself constantly in trouble with the law. When his grandmother has had enough after his latest arrest, Robbie is sent to Cocoa Beach, Florida to live with his aunt Cindy and uncle Glen. The night of his arrival, Robbie sneaks out of the house and goes to a local convenience store. There, he sees a young girl, Rina, sitting in a car. When he talks to her, Rina's boyfriend Bo harasses and punches Robbie in the face.

The next day at school, Robbie finds himself again harassed and embarrassed by Bo, who pushes him into the girls' restroom. At lunch, Robbie meets his first friend, Lenny, who sees the black eye and suggests that Robbie should learn self-defense or it will be the longest two months of his life. When Cindy invites him to lunch at her local restaurant, they are confronted by a thug. When Robbie confronts the thug verbally, the thug pulls out a knife. Cindy takes on the thug and uses martial arts to stop him. The police arrive and Robbie, in a state of shock, asks Cindy where she learned martial arts.

The following day, Robbie goes to the Space Coast Dojo, which is run by Glen. Robbie asks Glen to teach him martial arts and at first Glen refuses but then asks why. Robbie tells Glen that he is tired of being the person he has become and wants to do something about it. Glen takes Robbie in as a student and Robbie begins to change slowly. When Glen takes Robbie to a local bike shop to buy one for Robbie, Glen takes on a bully harassing the bike shop owner, who turns out to be Rina's father.

On his first bike ride, Robbie finds another local school, Dojo Extreme. There, he meets Coach Laurent Kaine, who unlike Glen believes that martial arts are for winning and destroying opponents. Robbie also learns that Bo is a student of Kaine's and leaves. Robbie continues his training with Glen and Cindy and begins to slowly change his ways. He becomes more friendly and begins to respect Glen and Cindy as if they were his real parents. Robbie even gets a job at the bike shop under the condition that he can attempt to steal Rina away from Bo. When Bo finds Robbie one day, he starts his verbal attack on Robbie but this time, Robbie doesn't budge. Glen, worried something dangerous happens, goes to Dojo Extreme to talk to Kaine. Kaine and Glen used to be friends, but their opposing views of martial arts have them rivals. When Kaine learns that Bo was the one who has been bullying Robbie, he tells Glen there's not much he can do because Bo's father has a lot of pull in town.

At a Halloween party, Robbie finally admits his feelings for Rina, who has been stood up by Bo so he can go off with his friends. The next day at the Space Coast Dojo, Rina finally reciprocates her feelings towards Robbie and the two become a couple, much to the chagrin of Bo. Meanwhile, Lenny is harassed by a trio of goons at the beach only to be rescued by Cindy. Cindy takes Lenny to the dojo and asks Robbie to teach him martial arts. When Robbie tells Lenny that martial arts is about protecting himself and others, Lenny agrees. Meanwhile, at Dojo Extreme, Kaine's obsession with his style forces his girlfriend Nika, to get upset and attempts to use a newcomer at the gym, Derek, to face Kaine. When Kaine uses his "assess, assert, and dismember" method, he breaks Derek's leg and apologizes to Nika.

When Rina calls Robbie and tells him that Bo has found her and has hurt her, Robbie flies into a rampage. He finds a bunch of Bo's friends to demand where he is and when they try to fight him, Robbie gets the upper hand. At a local pizza parlor, someone makes a viral video of Robbie fighting more of the Dojo Extreme team and it is uploaded for everyone to see. Robbie heads to Dojo Extreme and finds himself outnumbered by Kaine, Bo, and the rest of the dojo. However, Dojo Extreme learns that Robbie didn't come alone. Glen, Cindy, Lenny, and members of the Space Coast Dojo arrive. Robbie and Bo fight inside of a cage while the two schools go at it. When one of Dojo Extreme's members pulls out a gun, Cindy stops him in time and declares the rumble over. Glen follows Kaine to a baseball cage, where the two begin to fight. Meanwhile, Robbie finally defeats Bo using a grappling move. He celebrates his victory with a backflip and a loud 'kiai'. Meanwhile, Glen and Kaine fight in the cage with baseballs flying at them and then with baseball bats. Glen finally knocks Laurent down and tells him it is over. Kaine soon realizes that everyone does have something to learn.

Two weeks later, Glen, Cindy, Katie (Glen and Cindy's daughter), Robbie, Rina, and Lenny are at the beach when they are being watched. The man watching them from afar is Frank Whitlaw, Bo's father, who vows to get even with the Space Coast Dojo.

Cast
 Don "The Dragon" Wilson as Glen
 Cynthia Rothrock as Cindy
 Jansen Panettiere as Robbie Oakes
 Matthew Ziff as Bo Whitlaw
 Kathryn Newton as Rina
 Brandon Tyler Russell as Lenny
 Kayley Stallings as Katie
 T. J. Storm as Coach Laurent Kaine
 Natasha Blasick as Nika
 Inga Van Ardenn as Inga
 Lorraine Ziff as Peggy
 Jody Nolan as Raymond
 Sydney Sweeney as Julie
 Nassim Lahrizi as Hazma
 Jesse-Jane McParland as Space Coast Dojo Student
 Chuck Zito as Frank Whitlaw
 Billy R. Smith as Derek
 R. Marcos Taylor as Bike Shop Bully
 James R. Wilson as Onlooker In Cincinnati
 Cheryl Wheeler as Onlooker In Cincinnati
 Danny Pardo as Officer Vega

Production
The film was developed by James Wilson, the brother of lead actor Don "The Dragon" Wilson, as a modern-day version of The Karate Kid. When the film was announced, the filmmakers started a Kickstarter fund, in which they exceeded their target goal with $173,486 from 430 backers.

An open casting call was done in April in which over 250 people showed up. Production began on the weekend of June 7, 2014 in Cocoa Beach, Florida and Melbourne, Florida, for six days followed by eight days in Los Angeles, California.

To bring the spirit of martial arts in the film, many well-known martial artists, aside from Wilson, Rothrock, Ziff, and Storm, appear in the film in cameos either instructors or themselves. They include Olando Rivera, Christine Bannon-Rodrigues, Jeff W. Smith, Glenn C. Wilson, Carl Van Meter, and Dewey Cooper.

Reception
On Rotten Tomatoes the film has 3 negative reviews.

Martin Tsai of The Los Angeles Times writes: So we have one minority pitted against the other minority in a bid to prove which is worthier of inclusion, while the bad guy who started the fight, Bo, is white.

Monica Castillo of The Village Voice writes: Karate Kid homage offers decent messages, so-so story.

Sandie Angulo Chen of Common Sense Media writes: For a movie starring so many action stars and fighting champs, The Martial Arts Kid falls surprisingly short of winning any medals.

Awards
The film won the Best Florida Film at the Sunscreen Film Festival in St. Petersburg, Florida. Actor Matthew Ziff won the Best Supporting Actor award at the same festival for his role of bully Bo Whitlaw.
The film won three awards at the Melbourne Independent Filmmakers Festival including Best Dramatic Feature, Best Music Score, and the Humanitarian Award.

The film also received the highest rating from The Dove Foundation, giving the film 5 out of 5 Doves for "Family Approved Film".

Release
After multiple screenings all over the United States, the DVD and Blu-Ray were released via the film's official website on April 14, 2016.

Sequel
First announced on a featurette on the DVD of the original film, Cynthia Rothrock took to Facebook to announce that pre-production has begun on the sequel, which is to be called The Martial Arts Kid 2: Payback. Don Wilson and Cynthia Rothrock are returning in their roles of Glen and Cindy and Michael Baumgarten is returning to write and direct the sequel. James E. Wilson is returning as producer as well.

An IndieGogo promotion was announced to raise funds for the film on January 15, 2018. Aside from Wilson and Rothrock, original cast members T. J. Storm, Matthew Ziff, Brandon Tyler Russell, and Chuck Zito are returning and new cast members announced include Sasha Mitchell, Anita Clay, Benny Urquidez, and Bill "Superfoot" Wallace.

References

External links
 
 Official Website

2015 films
American martial arts films
Films about bullying
2015 martial arts films
2010s English-language films
2010s American films